The Sage Restaurant Group is the restaurant management arm of the Sage Hospitality group.

Areas Served 
The Sage Restaurant Group operates a total of 14 restaurants across six states. These are: Colorado, Oregon, California, Illinois, Ohio and Pennsylvania.

Colorado 
 The Corner Office Restaurant + Martini Bar, Denver (opened July 2007).
 Second Home Kitchen + Bar, Denver (opened May 2008).
 Kachina Southwestern Grill, Westminster (opened September 2012)
 Departure Restaurant + Lounge (opened August 2016)
 Kachina Southwestern Grill, Denver (opened April 2017)
 Urban Farmer, Denver (opened August 2017)
 The Emporium Kitchen and Wine Market (opened November 2017).

Illinois
 Mercat a la Planxa, Chicago (opened March 2008)

Oregon
 Urban Farmer, Portland (opened February 2009)
 Departure Restaurant and Lounge, Portland (opened March 2009)
 The Original Dinerant, Portland (opened May 2009)

California
 Hello Betty Fish House, Oceanside (opened February 2014)

Ohio
 Urban Farmer, Cleveland (opened May 2014)

Pennsylvania 
 Urban Farmer, Philadelphia (opened December 2015)
 Braddock's Pittsburgh Brasserie, Pittsburgh (opened September 2009)

References

Restaurant chains in the United States

External links 
Official website